National Highway 208A, commonly referred to as NH 208A is a national highway in  India. It is a spur road of National Highway 8. NH-208A traverses the states of Tripura and Assam in India.

Route 
Tripura
Kailashahar, Dharmanagar, Kadamtala, Premtola, Kurti RCC Bridge  - Assam border.
Assam
Tripura border - Kathaltali, Kukital, Chand Khera.

Junctions  

  Terminal near Kailashahar.
  Terminal near Kukital.

See also 

 List of National Highways in India
 List of National Highways in India by state

References

External links 

 NH 208A on OpenStreetMap

National highways in India
National Highways in Tripura
National Highways in Assam